Daniel G. Marsh (born 1937) is an American former politician in the state of Washington. He served in the Washington House of Representatives and Washington State Senate as a Democrat.

References

Living people
1937 births
Politicians from Salem, Oregon
Democratic Party Washington (state) state senators
Democratic Party members of the Washington House of Representatives